The national emblem of Djibouti was introduced after attaining independence from France on 27 June 1977. It was made by Hassan Robleh. It is bordered on the sides with laurel branches.  Within this perimeter there is a vertical spear, in front of which is a shield.   Underneath the shield, two hands rise away from the spear, both of which carry a large machete.  These two hands symbolize the main two ethnic groups of the nation: the Afar and the Issa. The spear is topped by a red star. The star symbolizes the unity between the Issa and the Afar peoples. A Djibouti law established the seal and states its significance, and has been translated into English.

References

See also
The similar coat of arms of Ukraine

National symbols of Djibouti
Dschibuti
Djibouti
Djibouti
Djibouti